The Youghiogheny River , or the Yough (pronounced Yok ) for short, is a  tributary of the Monongahela River in the U.S. states of West Virginia, Maryland, and Pennsylvania. It drains an area on the west side of the Allegheny Mountains northward into Pennsylvania, providing a small watershed in extreme western Maryland into the tributaries of the Mississippi River. Youghiogheny is a Lenape word meaning "a stream flowing in a contrary direction".

Variant names
According to the Geographic Names Information System, it has also been known historically as: 
 Gawgawgamie, Ohio Gani River, Roonanetto, Yanghyanghgain, Yaughvaughani, Yauyougaine River, Yawyawganey, Yawyougaine River, Yeoyogani, Yochio Geni, Yoghioghenny River, Yogyogany River, Yohioganey, Yohogany, Youghiogeny River, Youghogania, Youghyaughye, Youghyoghgyina River, Yoxhio geni River, Yoxhiogany, Yoxhiogeny, Yoxyougaine River, Yughiogeny

Geography

The Youghiogheny rises in northern West Virginia, in Preston County southeast of the town of Aurora and near Backbone Mountain. The river enters southwestern Pennsylvania on the border between Fayette and Somerset counties. It flows northwest through a gap in Chestnut Ridge and then past Connellsville. It joins the Monongahela River from the southeast at McKeesport, southeast of Pittsburgh.

The dam was completed in 1944 primarily for flood control. U.S. Route 40 crosses the Youghiogheny River Lake between Jockey Hollow on the Fayette County side and Somerfield on the Somerset County side.

History

In the colonial era and in the early United States, the valley of the river provided an important route of access through the mountains for settlers and military forces from Virginia to western Pennsylvania and the Ohio Country. In 1754, as a militia officer of the British Colony of Virginia, George Washington followed the river in an attempt to find a water route to Fort Duquesne, then held by the French.

During the uncommonly severe winter of 1787-88, American pioneers to the Northwest Territory departed New England and cut trails westward through the mountains. At Sumrill's Ferry, present-day West Newton, Pennsylvania, on the Youghiogheny River, the men built flatboats which carried them down the Youghiogheny River to the Monongahela River, and then to the Ohio River, and onward to the Northwest Territory.

The pioneer town of Somerfield, Pennsylvania, was inundated by the building of the Youghiogheny Dam. Perryopolis in northern Fayette County, Pennsylvania, is the site of the George Washington Grist Mill. The Youghiogheny River Trail follows the river in southwestern Pennsylvania southeast of Connellsville.

Coal mining became an important industry along the lower Youghiogheny River during the 19th century.  At that time, the name was often spelled Yohoghany (or variants thereof), and during the 1860s and 1870s that spelling was used as the name of a post office near what is now Shaner in Westmoreland County.

Fallingwater, designed by Frank Lloyd Wright, is located in the river valley southeast of Connellsville.

In 1976, a 21-mile long segment of the Youghiogheny in Maryland was given special protected status by the state as the Youghiogheny Scenic & Wild River. Though most of the land along this corridor is private, it is managed by the Maryland Department of Natural Resources to preserve its natural and cultural resources.

Recreation and travel
The Youghiogheny is popular for whitewater canoeing, kayaking and rafting. Four sections of the river, varying in difficulty, are available on a predictable basis for whitewater recreation:
 Top Yough, near Swallow Falls State Park in Maryland (Class IV-V)
 Upper Yough, from Sang Run to Friendsville, Maryland (Class IV-V)
 Middle Yough, from Confluence, Pennsylvania to Ohiopyle (Class II)
 Ohiopyle Falls in Ohiopyle State Park: Previously, this spectacular  waterfall was legal for kayakers and canoeists to run on only one weekend a year (Class IV), during a race and festival.  During August 2010, the Pennsylvania Department of Conservation and Natural Resources announced a pilot program allowing boaters to run the falls during three weeks from Sunday, August 22, 2010, through Sunday, September 12, 2010.  The program was successful, so the falls are accessible to whitewater kayakers and canoeists with the same rules as the test program.
 Lower Yough, which runs through Ohiopyle State Park from Ohiopyle to Bruner Run (Class III) This section is the busiest whitewater trip east of the Mississippi River, being completed by over 250,000 people each year.
 Further downstream, near Connellsville, the river is much slower, without whitewater rapids, and is able to be piloted by personal tubes, kayaks or canoes.

Although the Youghiogheny is generally considered to be safe for whitewater recreation, there have been 19 deaths on the Lower Yough. At least five, and possibly as many as 14, of the fatalities have occurred at a rapid within the Lower Yough known as Dimple Rock. Dimple refers to both the Class III rapid by that name, as well as an undercut rock in the middle of the rapid by that name. Some of the deaths were attributed to preexisting health conditions, with 9 of the 14 being caused by the rock itself.

The Youghiogheny is also known for fishing, having brown and rainbow trout, as well as smallmouth above the power plant discharge.

Part of the Great Allegheny Passage, a multi-use trail along the former Western Maryland Railway right-of-way, extends from Pittsburgh to Confluence.  From Confluence, it connects to Washington, D.C.

Amtrak's Capitol Limited, an overnight train connecting Chicago and Washington D.C., follows the Youghiogheny through southwest Pennsylvania into western Maryland, one of the most scenic stretches of Amtrak's national system, crossing from side to side of the river in several places.

Images

Crossings

The Great Crossings is the place on the river where George Washington and General Braddock forded the river in 1755, during the French and Indian War.

Treatment in fiction
The Youghiogheny River was likely the inspiration for the fictional Yuggogheny River, whose valley was used by Michael Chabon for the setting of his short story "In the Black Mill" from the 2000 collection Werewolves in their Youth.  His 2001 story "The God Of Dark Laughter" is also set in Yuggogheny County. In Chabon's 2000 Pulitzer Prize-winning novel The Amazing Adventures of Kavalier & Clay, an expert or experts on Yuggogheny cannibal cults are present at the party where Joe Kavalier saves Salvador Dalí from drowning.

The Youghiogheny River is mentioned (malapropped as "Young-iogheny") in an episode of the Rocky and Bullwinkle cartoon show. The river is also referred to (as Yochio Geni) in Thomas Pynchon's novel Mason & Dixon.

See also

American Pioneers to the Northwest Territory
List of rivers of Maryland
List of rivers of Pennsylvania
List of rivers of West Virginia
Meshach Browning (1781–1859), early backwoodsman and explorer of the Youghiogheny country

References

 Palmer, Tim (1984). Youghiogheny: Appalachian River. University of Pittsburgh Press. .

External links

 wikimapia.org Youghiogheny
U.S. Geological Survey: PA stream gaging stations
U.S. Army Corps of Engineers: Youghiogheny River Lake
State of Maryland: Youghiogheny Scenic and Wild River
Youghiogheny River Trail 
Youghiogheny River Trail
National Whitewater River Inventory: Upper Yough
National Whitewater River Inventory: Lower Yough
National Whitewater River Inventory: Middle Yough
National Whitewater River Inventory: Ohiopyle Falls
West Virginia Rivers Coalition

 
Rivers of Garrett County, Maryland
Rivers of Preston County, West Virginia
Rivers of Pennsylvania
Rivers of Allegheny County, Pennsylvania
Rivers of Westmoreland County, Pennsylvania
Rivers of Fayette County, Pennsylvania
Rivers of Somerset County, Pennsylvania
Tributaries of the Monongahela River